Guangzhou Bus Rapid Transit (Guangzhou BRT or GBRT) is the bus rapid transit (BRT) system of the city of Guangzhou in the People's Republic of China. Its first line was put into operation on 10 February 2010. It handles approximately 1,000,000  passenger trips daily with a peak passenger flow of 26,900 pphpd (second only to the TransMilenio BRT system in Bogota, Colombia). In fact, this rapid transit system contains the world's longest BRT stations - around 260m including bridges - with bus volumes of 1 bus every 10 seconds or 350 per hour in a single direction. The BRT system has two new lines and two extensions planned.

Fleet
The BRT operates the following models of buses:
 King Long XMQ6127G2
 King Long XMQ6180G2
 Youngman JNP6182LPG
 Yutong ZK6120HGV
 Yutong ZK6180HLGAA

The livery of the BRT is orange with BRT written in white on the sides.

Zhongshan Avenue Bus Rapid Transit Trial Line

Zhongshan Avenue Bus Rapid Transit Trial Line is the first and only line in operation of Guangzhou BRT. The line is laid out along Zhongshan Avenue (中山大道), whose innermost lanes form a dedicated BRT corridor. It starts at Tianhe Sports Center in Tianhe District in the west and ends at Xiayuan in Huangpu District in the east with 26 stations. Several stations have connections to Guangzhou Metro. Same-direction transfers between buses within the BRT corridor are free. The project won numerous awards such as the Sustainable Transportation Development Award in 2011, the first Chinese transportation project to win such award.

References

External links
 
 China Bus Rapid Transit: Guangzhou

Bus rapid transit in China
Transport in Guangzhou
2010 establishments in China